Cecil Carwin "Jim" Deming (July 15, 1924 – May 25, 2006) was an American football coach. He served as the head football coach at Carroll College in Helena, Montana in 1958.

Early years and education
Deming graduated from Trout Lake School in 1941.  He served in the United States Navy for four years during World War II.  He attended the Montana State School of Mines—now known as Montana Tech of the University of Montana—and graduated from the University of Montana in Missoula in 1948.

Head coaching record

College football

References

1924 births
2006 deaths
Carroll Fighting Saints football coaches
High school baseball coaches in the United States
High school basketball coaches in Montana
High school football coaches in Montana
High school wrestling coaches in the United States
United States Navy personnel of World War II
University of Montana alumni
Montana Technological University alumni
People from Kelso, Washington
People from Klickitat County, Washington
Sportspeople from Washington (state)